State Route 854 (SR 854) is a state highway in Pershing County, Nevada serving the vicinity of Lovelock. The route comprised a portion of former State Route 48.

Route description
State Route 854 begins northwest of Lovelock at an intersection with Pitt Road/Eagle Picher Mine Road (SR 399). The route then turns east and heads through farmlands towards downtown Lovelock. Entering the city limits at Jamestown Road, the road now follows Western Avenue through residential areas. SR 854 passes by the Pershing County Courthouse and then turns northeast on Dartmouth Avenue to terminate at an intersection with Main Street (SR 398) in downtown Lovelock.

History

SR 854 was originally designated as the easternmost end of the much longer State Route 48.  SR 48 followed the current highway away from Lovelock, then turned westward along present-day State Route 399 passing near the Seven Troughs Mine area to terminate at State Route 34 at Gerlach.  That route was designated by 1935.  On July 1, 1976, this section of SR 48 was reassigned to State Route 854 as part of the renumbering of Nevada's state highway system.

Major intersections

See also

References

854